is a railway station on the West Japan Railway Company (JR West) Hanwa Line in Nishi-Tanabecho Nichome, Abeno-ku, Osaka, Osaka Prefecture, Japan. When the platforms and the tracks were located on the ground, the station was located in Yamasaka Gochome, Higashisumiyoshi-ku. It is administrated by Sakaishi Station.

This station has been decorated Cerezo Osaka association football team color, logo and players since 2009 as it is the nearest station to Nagai Park, Nagai Stadium and Nagai Ball Gall Field (Kincho Stadium), the home of Cerezo.

Layout
When the station was located on the ground level, it had two side platforms serving 1 track each. After the elevation (northbound in 2004, southbound in 2006), it has two island platforms serving two tracks each.

Surroundings
Nagai Park
Nagai Stadium
Nagai Ball Gall Field (Kincho Stadium)
Sharp Corporation
Nishitanabe Station (Osaka Municipal Subway Midosuji Line)

History 
 1938 - Station opened

 March 2018 - Station numbering was introduced with Tsurugaoka being assigned station number JR-R23.

References

Abeno-ku, Osaka
Railway stations in Japan opened in 1938
Railway stations in Osaka